The Tour Player's Classic was a women's professional golf tournament on the Ladies European Tour that took place in England. It was only held in 1990 and 1997 in Tytherington, Cheshire.

Winners

Source:

References

External links
Ladies European Tour

Former Ladies European Tour events
Golf tournaments in England